Robert Muhiirwa (born 23 October 1958) is a Ugandan Roman Catholic priest who is the Bishop of the Roman Catholic Diocese of Fort Portal. He was appointed as bishop of Fort Portal on 18 March 2003.

Background and priesthood
Muhiirwa was born on 23 October 1958, in Ibonde Village, in present-day Kabarole District, in the Toro sub-region, in the Western Region of Uganda. He was ordained a priest on 11 August 1985 and served as priest of the Diocese of Fort Portal, until 18 March 2003.

As bishop
Muhiirwa was appointed Bishop of Fort Portal on 18 March 2003 and was consecrated a bishop at Fort Portal on 15 June 2003 by Cardinal Emmanuel Wamala, Archbishop of Archdiocese of Kampala, assisted by Bishop Paul Lokiru Kalanda† who was the Bishop Emeritus of Fort Portal Diocese and Bishop Deogratias Muganwa Byabazaire†, Bishop of Roman Catholic Diocese of Hoima.

Succession table

References

External links

 Profile of the Roman Catholic Diocese of Fort Portal
 Two Ordained Priests In East Africa As of 8 September 2015.

1958 births
21st-century Roman Catholic bishops in Uganda
People from Kabarole District
Living people
Roman Catholic bishops of Fort Portal